David Isaac Spivak (born May 1, 1978) is an American mathematician. He has held research positions at the University of Oregon and the Massachusetts Institute of Technology. He is known for his work on applications of category theory to science and engineering, in particular to agent interactions involving communication, learning and planning. He is the author of two introductory texts on category theory and its applications, Category Theory for the Sciences and An Invitation to Applied Category Theory.

Early life and education 
Spivak was born in Los Angeles, California, and grew up near Baltimore, Maryland. He went to college at University of Maryland, College Park and to graduate school at UC Berkeley. His dissertation, written under the supervision of Peter Teichner and Jacob Lurie, was on derived manifolds, generalizations of manifolds whose intersection theory is better behaved. Spivak did postdocs at the University of Oregon and MIT. He is the great-great-great-grandson of Charles David Spivak, a cousin of entomologist Marla Spivak, but is unrelated to mathematician Michael Spivak.

Spivak's contributions 
Spivak's first approach to his main research agenda consisted in developing a novel approach to the integration of data from different sources (databases). He showed that viewing database schemas as categories facilitated the definition of schema integration and data migration. Further work along these lines involved the use of concepts of algebraic topology (leading to the concept of simplicial databases, which have an underlying simplicial set structure) and more advanced categorical tools (e.g. monads and Kleisli categories, allowing the addition of extra information in database cells). These techniques are being implemented by a start-up company, CONEXUS.ai.

Spivak's quest for methods to improve the communication among different entities has extended to the interaction among different scientific fields, leading to the development of a human-readable categorical system of knowledge representation called ologs. These were applied, in a series of collaborations with the materials scientist Markus Buehler, to different problems in that field Ologs have been also used by researchers at NIST and by engineers at the European Spallation Source. 

The goal of ologs, and of Spivak's book was to show that category theory can be made relatively easy and thus be understood by a wider audience; indeed Piet Hut endorsed the book saying, "This is the first, and so far the only, book to make category theory accessible to non-mathematicians."

Spivak's interest in interacting systems led to the study of interconnected systems, focusing on the ways in which different dynamical systems can be composed. The concept of operads and their algebras provides a better understanding of the behavior of such system, in particular the property of compositionality, i.e. the characterization of the behavior of systems in terms of that of its parts and their interactions. Similarly, Spivak studied the ways in which systems adapt internally in response to their interaction with others.  Operads were used to develop a Python library for materials architecture. An original application has been to the search of solutions to systems of equations by considering their pixel array representations.
Spivak and coworkers have proven the claim that the well-known backpropagation algorithm used in deep learning networks constitutes a monoidal functor between the category of neural networks and the category of learning algorithms.

Another important area in which Spivak has been active is the study of the behavior of systems in time. An important collaboration with Patrick Schultz led to the development of a topos-theoretical approach to behavior, being one of its main components a temporal type theory.

David Spivak has worked with his postdoctoral student Brendan Fong on hypergraph categories, a useful tool for representing compositionality in different applied contexts, allowing a visually attractive representation as wiring diagrams. Also with Fong, Spivak has written a book that summarizes for the first time the developments in applied category theory for a wide audience, and started a nonprofit applied category theory research institute called Topos Institute, located in Berkeley, California.

Spivak is an editor of a diamond open access journal, Compositionality.

Bibliography 
 Spivak. Category Theory for the Sciences, MIT Press, 2014
 Schultz & Spivak. Temporal Type Theory: a Topos-Theoretic Approach to Systems and Behavior, Springer-Verlag, 2019, 
 Fong & Spivak. An Invitation to Applied Category Theory: Seven Sketches in Compositionality, Cambridge University Press, 2019,

References

External links 
 Spivak's MIT Homepage
 MIT Applied Category Theory Course, 2019

1978 births
Living people
American textbook writers
American male non-fiction writers
21st-century American  mathematicians
Category theorists
Massachusetts Institute of Technology people
People from Los Angeles